Nicola Xenos (born 8 March 2001) is an Australian rules footballer who plays for St Kilda in the AFL Women's (AFLW). It was revealed Xenos had signed on with the Saints for two more years on 30 June 2021, tying her to the club until the end of the 2022/2023 season.

Xenos is currently studying a Bachelor of Exercise and Sport Science/Bachelor of Business (Sport Management) at Deakin University. She attended high school at Ruyton Girls School and Carey Baptist Grammar School.

References

External links

 

Living people
2001 births
Oakleigh Chargers players (NAB League Girls)
St Kilda Football Club (AFLW) players
Australian rules footballers from Victoria (Australia)
Sportswomen from Victoria (Australia)
People educated at Carey Baptist Grammar School